Giannettino Odone (1626 in Genoa - 1698 in Genoa) was the 124th Doge of the Republic of Genoa and king of Corsica.

Biography 
On 16 July 1677 Odone was elected doge of Genoa, the seventy-ninth in two-year succession and the one hundred and twenty-fourth in republican history. As doge he was also invested with the related biennial office of king of Corsica. Once the Dogate ended from July 16, 1679, he still continued to serve the republic in offices and magistrates until 1694. Giannettino Odone died in Genoa during 1698.

See also 

 Republic of Genoa
 Doge of Genoa

References 

17th-century Doges of Genoa
1626 births
1698 deaths